John Edward Oldfield (13 July 1918 – 2006) was an English footballer who played at right-half for Port Vale shortly after World War II.

Career
Oldfield played for Helsby, before joining Port Vale as an amateur in December 1945. He became a regular in the war leagues, and signed as a professional in February 1946. He actually guested for Vale's opponents on 20 April 1946, when Southend United lost 2–1 at The Old Recreation Ground. Oldfield then played for Vale in the reverse fixture two days later – which finished 1–1. He lost his place as the war ended and so only played one Third Division South game in the Football League, before being released by manager Gordon Hodgson at the end of the 1946–47 season.

Career statistics
Source:

References

1918 births
2006 deaths
People from Helsby
Sportspeople from Cheshire
English footballers
Association football midfielders
Port Vale F.C. players
Southend United F.C. wartime guest players
English Football League players